Vince Monton is an Australian cinematographer, writer and director. He made several films in the 1970s for Antony I. Ginnane.

Select Credits
Fantasm Comes Again (1977) - cinematographer
Newsfront (1978) - cinematographer
Windrider (1986) - director
Fatal Bond (1991) - director

References

External links

Australian cinematographers
Living people
Year of birth missing (living people)
Place of birth missing (living people)